Evatt may refer to:

 The English surname Evatt
 Clive Evatt (1900–1984), Australian politician and lawyer
 Elizabeth Evatt (born 1933), Australian lawyer and jurist
 George Evatt (1843–1921), British general
 H. Parker Evatt (born 1935), American politician
 H. V. Evatt (1894–1965), Australian politician and judge
 Ian Evatt (born 1981), English footballer
 Richard Evatt (1973–2012), British boxer
 Evatt, Australian Capital Territory, suburb of Canberra, Australia